Crawfordina is a genus of medium-sized sea snails, marine gastropod molluscs in the family Cancellariidae, the nutmeg snails.

Species
According to the World Register of Marine Species (WoRMS), the following species with valid names are within the genus Crawfordina :
 Crawfordina crawfordiana Dall, 1891
 Crawfordina stuardoi McLean, J.H. & Andrade, 1982

References

 Hemmen J. (2007) Recent Cancellariidae. Annotated and illustrated catalogue of Recent Cancellariidae. Privately published, Wiesbaden. 428 pp. [With amendments and corrections taken from Petit R.E. (2012) A critique of, and errata for, Recent Cancellariidae by Jens Hemmen, 2007. Conchologia Ingrata 9: 1-8

Cancellariidae